Chris Ihidero (born 19 March 1976) is a Nigerian filmmaker. He is the head writer/story editor on MNet's TV drama Hush.

Biography 
Ihidero holds first and second degrees in Literature-in-English from Lagos State University and the University of Ibadan.

He has worked as a theatre artist, broadcaster, newspaper columnist, magazine editor and university lecturer. From 2005, he taught at the School of Part-time Studies of the Lagos State University.

In 2007, he joined Amaka Igwe Studios, which was a leading audio-visual production company in Nigeria, as a trainee director. From there, he rose to become the chief operating officer in 2010. He has also worked as Director of Studies at the Centre for Excellence in Film and Media Studies in Lagos, which was the research and training arm of Amaka Igwe Studios.

In September 2013, Ihidero became the chief operating officer of Q Entertainment Network.

In September 2014, he launched PinPoint Media a 360 media and production company. PinPoint Media is a mother company to Lagos Film Academy(LFA), ScreenKraft and TNS.

In December 2014, he launched True Nollywood Stories (TNS), as a platform for news, views, reviews, opinion and general information around Nigeria's film industry.

In 2015, he was a producer on Shuga Series 4.

Ihidero has also been involved in training Nigerians in storytelling skills. The trainings such as Story Story and TV Writing masterclass.

Journalism 
Ihidero has chaired the Editorial Board of Nigerian Entertainment Today (NET) since 2012.

He was the editor of MADE, a men's lifestyle magazine. from 2007 to 2009.

He has also worked as a newspaper columnist, for The Guardian, TheNET and TNS for over ten years.

Film/directing career 
Ihidero has directed over 100 hours of TV drama. He has made two short films, including Big Daddy (2012), a film about rape, which premiered at the Silverbird Cinemas in Lagos in December 2011. At over 500,000 views, it has become the most watched short film in Nigeria. The film won the "Special Jury Award" and "Best Editing Award" at the 2012 In-Short International Film Festival which took place in Lagos in October 2012.

In 2015, Ihidero helped direct It Happened to Me, a short film written by Amaka Igwe. It was premiered at UNESCO Headquarters in Paris in November 2013, and in Nigeria in April 2015. The film was commissioned as part of the United Nations Programme on HIV/AIDS (UNAIDS) aimed at using culturally appropriate strategies to strengthen youth involvement with HIV/AIDS prevention activities in Nigeria.

Filmography 
 Fuji House of Commotion – Director, over 52 episodes, Television Comedy, since September 2008
 Now We Are Married – Director, Television Drama, 18 episodes, 2009/2012.
 VIP – Director, 15 episodes, Television Thriller, 2010
 Big Daddy, Writer-Director-Producer, Short Film (12Mins). 2011.
 It Happened to Me – Director. Short Film (15mins). 2013.
 Shuga – Producer. 2014.
 HUSH – MNET Series. – Head Writer/Story Editor
 FORBIDDEN – MNET Series. -Head Writer/ Showrunner

See also
 List of Nigerian film producers

References 

Living people
1976 births
Filmmakers from Lagos
Lagos State University alumni
Nigerian editors
Nigerian journalists
Nigerian writers
University of Ibadan alumni
Nigerian male writers
Nigerian television writers
Igbo people
Nigerian film producers
Nigerian television producers
Nigerian media personalities
Nigerian television personalities
Nigerian screenwriters